The World Summit for Social Development was a conference held in Copenhagen from 6–12 March 1995. It aimed to "establish a people-centered framework for social development, to build a culture of cooperation and partnership and to respond to the immediate needs of those who are most affected by human distress."

Organisations whose representatives addressed the summit included Grameen Bank, Soroptimist International, and Rotary International.

References

United Nations conferences
1995 in women's history
1995 conferences
1995 in international relations
20th-century diplomatic conferences
Denmark and the United Nations